Işıklı is a village in Silifke district of Mersin Province, Turkey. It is situated in a narrow plain between the Toros Mountains and hills at the Mediterranean Sea side. At   is near to state highway . The population of the village is 1140 as of 2011.

References

Villages in Silifke District